Lwengo is a town in Central Uganda. It is the chief municipal, administrative and commercial center of Lwengo District. It was known as Mbiriizi, prior to 1 July 2010.

Location

Population
The 2014 national population census put the population of Lwengo Municipality at 15,527

Points of interest
 The headquarters of Lwengo District Administration
 The offices of Lwengo Town Council
 Lwengo Central Market - The largest source of fresh produce in the town
 The headquarters of Lwengo Microfinance Cooperative Society Limited (LWEMICOS)

References

External links
 Website of Lwengo Microfinance Cooperative Society Limited (LWEMICOS)

Populated places in Central Region, Uganda
Lwengo District